4-Phenylazepane, also known as phenazepane, is a chemical compound.

It is the base structure in a series of opioid analgesics, including:

 Ethoheptazine
 Metheptazine
 Metethoheptazine
 Proheptazine

Meptazinol, another opioid analgesic, is a 3-phenylazepane derivative.

See also 
 4-Phenylpiperidine
 Azepane

Azepanes